Fenquizone (INN) is a diuretic, part of the class of low-ceiling sulfonamide diuretics. Fenquizone is used primarily in the treatment of oedema and hypertension.

See also
Quinethazone
Metolazone

References

Quinazolines
Lactams
Sulfonamides
Chloroarenes